The 1971 Nobel Peace Prize was awarded to the Chancellor of Germany Willy Brandt (1913–1992) "for paving the way for a meaningful dialogue between East and West." Because of his efforts to strengthen cooperation in western Europe through the European Economic Community (EEC) and to achieve reconciliation between West Germany and the countries of Eastern Europe, he became the fourth German recipient of the prestigious Peace Prize.

Laureate

Willy Brandt was active in German politics since his youth. He was engaged in clandestine resistance against the Nazis and went into exile in Norway in 1933. There he joined the Labour Party where he campaigned for a Nobel Peace Prize to Carl von Ossietzky. When the German occupation of Norway took place in 1940, he fled to Sweden where he worked as a journalist documenting the brutality of World War II. After the war, Brandt returned to Germany and continued engaging in politics becoming Mayor of West Berlin in 1957, Minister for Foreign Affairs in 1966, Leader of the Social Democratic Party in 1964 and Chancellor of Germany in 1969. As federal Chancellor, he made decisive efforts for West Germany to sign the Treaty on the Non-Proliferation of Nuclear Weapons (NPT), established a peaceful agreement – the Treaty of Mosco – with the Soviet Union in 1970, and another agreement – the Treaty of Warsaw with Poland in the same year which entailed that West Germany accepted the new national boundaries in Eastern Europe that had become effective in 1945. These treaties laid the foundations for the Four Power Agreement on Berlin which made it easier for families from either side of the divided city to visit each other. He resigned as Chancellor in May 1974.

Deliberations

Nominations
Brandt had not been nominated before for the peace prize, making him one of the laureates who won on a rare occasion when they have been awarded the Nobel Prize in Literature the same year they were first nominated. Brandt only received three separate nominations: one from Jens Otto Krag (1914–1978) of Denmark, another from Wolfgang Yourgrau (1908–1979) the United States and a joint nomination by three politicians (La Pira of Italy, De Chambrun of France, and Dia of Senegal).

In total, the Norwegian Nobel Committee received 86 nominations for 33 individuals and 7 organizations including Vinoba Bhave, Hélder Câmara, Cyrus S. Eaton, Alfonso García Robles (awarded in 1982), Clarence Streit, Elie Wiesel (awarded in 1986) and the Universal Esperanto Association (UEA). Eighteen individuals and two organizations were nominated for the first time such as Cesar Chavez, Tage Erlander, Einar Gerhardsen, Jean Monnet, Arvid Pardo, Stefan Wyszyński, Herbert York and the Centre for Cultural and Social Cooperation in France. French activist Louise Weiss, also a first-time recommended, was the only woman nominated that year. Notable figures like Jacobo Árbenz, Nora Stanton Barney, Carlo Braga, Louis Lecoin, Reinhold Niebuhr, Hiratsuka Raichō, Miriam Soljak, William Griffith Wilson and Waldo Williams died in 1971 without having been nominated for the peace prize.

Norwegian Nobel Committee
The following members of the Norwegian Nobel Committee appointed by the Storting were responsible for the selection of the 1971 Nobel laureate in accordance with the will of Alfred Nobel:

Notes

References

External links

1971
Willy Brandt